Wais is a given name.

People
Wais Ibrahim Khairandesh, Afghan athlete
Wais Barmak, Afghan politician and former member of the Ghani administration

Places
Veys, a city in Khuzestan Province, Iran

See also
WAIS (disambiguation)